Kalapi is a 1966 Indian Gujarati biographical film directed by Manhar Raskapur, starring Sanjeev Kumar, Padmarani, Aruna Irani, Nutan, Pranlal Kharsani. The film was produced by Pragya Pictures, and the story was written by Prabodh Joshi. Shankar Bakel was a cinematographer.

Plot
The story of the film is based on the life of prince of Lathi state and Gujarati poet Kalapi (1874-1900), who died at age of 26.

Cast
The cast was:

Sanjeev Kumar as Kalapi
Padmarani
Aruna Irani
Vishnukumar Vyas
P. Kharsani
Pratap Ojha
Nandini Desai
Narayan Rajgor
Dineshkumar
D. S. Mehta
Ashok Thakkar
Premshankar Bhatt
Ajit Soni
Nutan
Manoj Purohit
Jayant Vyas
Miss Jayashree
Madhumati

Sound track

References

External links
 

1966 films
Films scored by Avinash Vyas
Films shot in Gujarat
Indian black-and-white films
1960s Gujarati-language films
1960s biographical films
Indian biographical films
Biographical films about royalty